Nearshore may refer to:
Littoral zone, the part of a sea, lake or river which is close to the shore
Nearshoring, the outsourcing of business processes to companies in a nearby country.